Elsholtzia penduliflora is a species of flowering plant in the family Lamiaceae. It is native to Vietnam, and Yunnan in China, and has been introduced to Thailand. In Vietnam, E.penduliflora is claimed to be a medicinal herb good for colds and fevers. Essential oil from chùa dù can be used as a substitute for eucalyptus oil.

References

Lamiaceae
Flora of Vietnam
Flora of South-Central China
Plants described in 1918